This is a list of staff at Pixar Animation Studios. This includes past Pixar employees, as well as those who served as its primary directors and creative executives.

Key 

 AB: Ash Brannon
 AlB: Alan Barillaro
 AC: Andrew Coats
 AJ:  Andrew Jimenez
 AM: Angus MacLane
 AdM: Adrian Molina
 AuM: Austin Madison
 AJR: A. J. Riebli
 ARS: Alvy Ray Smith
 AS: Andrew Stanton
 AW:  Andrea Warren
 BA: Bonnie Arnold
 BAR: Bobby Alcid Rubio
 BB: Brad Bird
 BB: Ben Burtt
 BC: Brenda Chapman
 BF: Brian Fee
 BL: Bud Luckey
 BnL:  Brian Larsen
 BrL: Brad Lewis
 BP: Bob Peterson
 BoP:  Bob Pauley
 BW:  Brad West
 CK: Craig Kellman
 DF: Danielle Feinberg
 DG: Dan Gerson
 DH: Darren Holmes
 DKA: Darla K. Anderson
 DL: Dan Lee
 DLM:  Daniel López Muñoz
 DM:  Dave Mullins
 DaM: Dana Murray
 DR:  Denise Ream
 DS: Dan Scanlon
 DoS: Doug Sweetland
 DmS: Domee Shi
 DvS: David Silverman
 DT:  David Torres
 EC: Edwin Catmull
 EdC: Edwing Chang
 ErC: Enrico Casarosa
 EFO: Eben Fiske Ostby
 EK:  Edgar Karapetyan
 ElK: Elissa Knight
 EM: Erica Milsom
 GM: Glenn McQueen
 GQ: Guido Quaroni
 GR: Gary Rydstrom
 GS:  Galyn Susman
 GCS: Gini Cruz Santos
 GW:  Graham Walters
 HJ: Harley Jessup
 IN: Irsan Nurwan
 JC:  Jim Capobianco
 JsC: Josh Cooley
 JK: John Kahrs
 JCK:  Jean-Claude Kalache
 JaK:  Jason Katz
 JoK: Jorgen Klubien
 JL: John Lasseter
 JaL: Janet Lucroy
 JeL:  Jeremy Lasky
 JM: Jim Morris
 JFM: James Ford Murphy
 JaP: Jan Pinkava
 JeP: Jeff Pidgeon
 JdR: John Ratzenberger
 JeR: Jerome Ranft
 JhR: Joe Ranft
 JoR: Jonas Rivera
 JS:  Jay Shuster
 JW: John Walker
 KB: Kyle Balda
 KOB: Kevin O'Brien
 KL: Kristen Lester
 KM:  Kelsey Mann
 KeR:  Kevin Reher
 KoR: Kori Rae
 KS: Katherine Sarafian
 KeS: Ken Schretzmann
 KW:  Kim White
 LC: Loren Carpenter
 LiC:  Lindsey Collins
 LR: Lou Romano
 LU: Lee Unkrich
 MA: Mark Andrews
 MaA:  Mahyar Abousaeedi
 MiA: Michael Arndt
 MtA:  Matt Aspbury
 MJ: Mike Jones
 ML: Matthew Luhn
 MLF: Meg LeFauve
 MO: Michael K. O'Brien
 MN:  Mark Nielsen
 MS: Michael Silvers
 MaS: Marc Sondheimer
 MdS: Madeline Sharafian
 MiS:  Michael Sparber
 MW:  Mark Walsh 
 MaW: Magnus Wrenninge
 NPG: Nicole Paradis Grindle
 NP: Nick Pitera
 NCS:  Nicolas C. Smith
 NS:  Nick Sung
 OS: Osnat Shurer
 PD: Pete Docter
 PL: Patrick Lin
 PS: Peter Sohn
 RA: Robert Anderson
 RLB:  Robert L. Baird
 RC: Robert L. Cook
 RDC: Ronnie Del Carmen
 RE: Ralph Eggleston
 RG: Ralph Guggenheim
 RLG:  Roger L. Gould
 RoG:  Rob Gibbs
 RK:  Robert Kondo
 RN:  Ricky Nierva
 RQ:  Rich Quade
 RS: Rosana Sullivan
 RT: Randy Thom
 SC: Sharon Calahan
 SCH: Steven Clay Hunter
 SJ: Steve Jobs
 SjP: Sanjay Patel
 SPR:  Stevey Pilcher
 SPL: Steve Purcell
 SS: Stephen Schaffer
 SU:  Saschka Unseld
 TD: Tom Duff
 TM: Tom Myers
 TN: Teddy Newton
 TP: Tom Porter
 WC:  William Cone
 WR: William Reeves

Feature films

Original short films

Shorts based on feature films

References

Staff
 
Lists of people by employer